Nikki may refer to:

Arts and entertainment

Fictional characters
 Nikki (Barbie), a fashion doll in the Barbie toy line
 Nikki (comics), a Marvel Comics character
 Nikki and Paulo, from the TV series Lost
 Nikki, the mascot of Swapnote
 Nikki, the main character from Dork Diaries

Music
 Nikki (album), by Nikki Yanofsky, 2010
 Nikki, an album by Quruli, 2005
 "Nikki" (song), by Forever the Sickest Kids, 2013
 "Nikki", a song by Logic from Under Pressure, 2014
 "Nikki", an instrumental composition by Burt Bacharach

Other media
 Nikki (DC Thomson), a 1980s girls' comic
 Nikki (TV series), a 2000s American series starring Nikki Cox
 Nikki, Wild Dog of the North, a 1961 Walt Disney film

People
 Nikki (given name), including a list of people with the name

Singers
 Nikki (singer), Japanese-American singer
 Nikki (Malaysian singer), Nikki Palikat (born 1985), a finalist in the first season of Malaysian Idol
 Nigar Jamal (born 1980) or Nikki, English-Azerbaijani singer

Other uses
 Nikki (drug), marketing name of a birth control pill
 Nikki, Benin, a city, arrondissement and commune

See also

 Nicci (disambiguation)
 Nicki (disambiguation)
 Nicky (disambiguation)
 Nickey (disambiguation)
 Nickie (disambiguation)
 'Nique (disambiguation)

 Nikii Daas
 NikkieTutorials
 Nikky Finney
 Nikky
 Niky